The 1964 Yale Bulldogs football team represented Yale University in the 1964 NCAA University Division football season.  The Bulldogs were led by second-year head coach John Pont, played their home games at the Yale Bowl and finished third in the Ivy League season with a 4–2–1 record, 6–2–1 overall.

Schedule

References

Yale
Yale Bulldogs football seasons
Yale Bulldogs football